HD 125442 is a single star in the southern constellation of Lupus. Its apparent visual magnitude is 4.78, which can be seen with the naked eye.

This is an F-type subgiant star with a stellar classification of F0 IV, having, at the age of 614 million years, used up the hydrogen at its core and begun the process of evolving into a giant star. It has 1.49 times the mass of the Sun and is radiating 19 times the Sun's luminosity from its photosphere at an effective temperature of 7,344 K. The star displays a high rate of spin with a projected rotational velocity of 148 km/s.

References

F-type subgiants
Lupus (constellation)
Durchmusterung objects
125442
070104
5364